Alpova is a genus of fungi in the family Boletaceae. The genus contains about 20 species of ectomycorrhizal false-truffles that collectively have a widespread distribution, especially in northern temperate areas. The genus was circumscribed by Carroll William Dodge in 1931.

Species

References

External links

Paxillaceae
Boletales genera
Taxa named by Carroll William Dodge
Taxa described in 1931